Safeya Binzagr (born 1940) is a Saudi Arabian artist. She is a supporter of the art scene in Jeddah. She opened her own museum and gallery, the Darat Safeya Binzagr in 2000. Binzagr is the only artist in her country to have their own museum.

Early years 
Binzagr was born in 1940 to a "well-known merchant family" in Jeddah. Binzagr was privately taught art in Egypt and went on to earn a degree from St Martin's School of Art in 1965.

Career 
Her first exhibition took place in 1968. In 1970, she was the first woman to hold a solo exhibition of her work in Saudi Arabia. Despite her art being presented, she was not allowed to attend the openings of her own exhibitions until Aramco held a private exhibition of her work in 1976. She was instead represented by male members of her family. In 1973, she chose to stop selling her art. In 1979, she published a book about Saudi Arabian art called Saudi Arabia, An Artist's View of the Past. The book has been translated into English and French.

Binzagr's work uses various mediums, ranging from oil paint, watercolor, pastel, drawing and etchings. Her work often centers around daily life in Saudi Arabia. She has series of works based on themes such as marriage customs, local costumes and old homes in Saudi Arabia. Binzagr paints cultural themes in order to preserve the cultural traditions of her country. Some of her paintings are based on descriptions given to her by older women about their lives. Binzagr meticulously researches her paintings, either by capturing through photographs images of buildings, craftwork and neighborhoods or by looking through historic documents and photography. Much of the history she has recorded belongs to the Hejaz cultural tradition.

Binzagr's work can be seen in her museum, the Darat Safeya Binzagr, where admission is free. She started to imagine a place where she could permanently display and curate her work in 1989. The museum took about nine years of planning and construction and was opened in 2000. The museum serves as her home, her studio, and as a gallery of her work. Binzagr hosts public events at her museum to promote art in Saudi Arabia.

References

Citations

Sources

External links 
 Official site

1940 births
People from Jeddah
Saudi Arabian women artists
Saudi Arabian artists
Living people
Saudi Arabian expatriates in Egypt
Saudi Arabian expatriates in the United Kingdom